Bocian is a Polish word for stork. It may also refer to:

 Bocian, Masovian Voivodeship, a village in Poland
 Bocian (surname)
 PZL Bielsko SZD-9, Polish-made performance/training glider

See also